Rajashekhara was a Sanskrit poet, dramatist and critic. He was the court poet of the Gurjara Pratiharas.

Rajashekhara wrote the Kāvyamīmāṃsā between  880 and 920 CE. The work is essentially a practical guide for poets that explains the elements and composition  of a good poem. He is most noted for the Kārpūramañjarī, a play written in Maharashtri Prakrit. Rajashekhara wrote the play to please his wife, Avantisundarī, a woman of taste and accomplishment. Rajashekhara is perhaps the only ancient Indian poet to acknowledge a woman for her contributions to his literary career.

Life
In his Bālarāmāyaṇa and Kāvyamimāṃsā, Rajashekhara referred himself by his family name Yāyāvara or Yāyāvarīya. In Bālarāmāyaṇa, he mentioned that his great grandfather Akalajalada belonged to Maharashtra. In the same work, he described his father Durduka as a Mahamantrin (minister) without providing any details. He mentioned in his works that his wife Avantisundari belonged to the Chahamana (Chauhan) family. In his works, he described himself as the teacher of the Gurjara-Pratihara king Mahendrapala I.

Works

The works attributed to poet Rajshekhara include:
 Viddhaśālabhañjikā
 Bālabhārata
 Karpūramañjarī
 Bālarāmāyaṇa
 Kāvyamīmāṃsā

References

History of Maharashtra
Indian male poets
9th-century Indian poets
10th-century Indian poets